Russian Classification of Territories of Municipal Formations, or OKTMO, is one of several Russian national registers. OKTMO organizes information about the structure of the municipal divisions of Russia.

The document assigns numeric codes to each municipal division of the country.

OKTMO is used for statistical and tax purposes. It was adopted on 14 December 2005 and went into effect on 1 January 2014, replacing OKATO (Russian Classification on Objects of Administrative Division).

See also
OKATO, Russian Classification on Objects of Administrative Division

Notes

External links

OKTMO on Russian Federal State Statistics Service site

Political divisions of Russia
Geocodes
Municipal divisions of Russia